Energa AZS Koszalin (formerly AZS Politechnika Koszalin) is a Polish women's handball team, based in Koszalin. The club was founded in 1999 and debut it first debut in the Polish Ekstraklasa in 2004.

They play their home matches in Hala Widowiskowo-Sportowa, which have capacity for 2,250 spectators. They play mostly in green shirts and black shorts.

Honours
Polish Superliga:
Bronze: 2013, 2018, 2019
Polish Cup:
Winner: 2008
Finalist: 2009
Women's EHF Challenge Cup
Quarterfinalist: 2012/13

Arena 
Arena: Hala Widowiskowo-Sportowa
City: Koszalin 
Capacity: 2,250
Address: Śniadeckich 4, 75-453 Koszalin

Team

Current squad
Squad for the 2021–22 season

Goalkeepers
1   Katarzyna Zimny
 12  Natalia Filończuk
 88  Alekxandra Ivanytsia
Left wingers
 5  Gabriela Urbania
 9   Żaneta Lipok
Right wingers
 10  Aleksandra Zalesny
 24  Emilia Kowalik
Line players
 27  Hanna Rycharska
 91  Daria Somionka

Left backs
 6  Paula Mazurek
 7  Anna Mączka
 55  Adrianna Nowicka
Centre backs
 23  Martyna Żukowska
 71  Martyna Borysławska
Right backs
 11  Gabriela Haric
 31  Adrianna Kurdzielewicz

Transfers 
Transfers for the 2022-23 season

 Joining
 
 Leaving

See also
 Handball in Poland
 Sports in Poland

References

Polish handball clubs
Sport in Koszalin